Sundari is a 2021 Indian Kannada language drama series starring Aishwarya Pisse and Sameeip Acharyaa in lead roles. The show premiered on 11 January 2021 in Udaya TV.

Plot
Sundari is the story of a girl who faces discrimination for her dark skin, but yet she fights against adversities in life. She has a kind heart but struggles to find the right man to marry. Undeterred, she strives to become an IAS officer. Her journey towards achieving her goal takes her through many ups and downs in life and she firmly believes that inner beauty is more important than physical appearance, which forms the crux of the story.

Cast

Main
Aishwarya Pisse as Sundari Karan
Sameeip Acharyaa as Karan
Shiny Pereira as Namratha Karan

Supporting
Sneha Eshwar
Dingri Nagaraj

Special episodes
On August 15, 2021, it aired a one-hour special episode.

Production
The serial marks the second production of actor Ramesh Aravind as a TV series producer after the supernatural series Nandini Season 2.

Adaptations

References

2021 Indian television series debuts
Kannada-language television shows
Udaya TV original programming